This is a list of Canadian Twenty20 International cricketers.

A Twenty20 International (T20I) is an international cricket match between two teams that have official ODI status, as determined by the International Cricket Council. It is played under the rules of Twenty20 cricket and is the shortest form of the game. The first such match was played on 17 February 2005 between Australia and New Zealand. The Canada national cricket team played its first T20I match on 2 August 2008, against the Netherlands as part of the 2008 ICC World Twenty20 Qualifier, winning the match by 4 wickets.

This list comprises all members of the Canada national cricket team who have played at least one T20I match. It is initially arranged in the order in which each player won his first Twenty20 cap. Where more than one player won his first Twenty20 cap in the same match, those players are listed alphabetically by surname.

Key

Players
Statistics are correct as of 21 November 2022.

See also
Twenty20 International
Canadian cricket team
Canadian national cricket captains
List of Canada ODI cricketers

References

Canada Twenty20
Twenty20